Lesbian, gay, bisexual, and transgender (LGBT) persons in Serbia face legal challenges not experienced by non-LGBT residents. Both male and female same-sex sexual activity are legal in Serbia, and discrimination on the basis of sexual orientation in areas such as employment, education, media, and the provision of goods and services, amongst others, is banned. Nevertheless, households headed by same-sex couples are not eligible for the same legal protections available to opposite-sex couples.

In May 2014, Amnesty International identified Serbia as one of a number of countries where there is a marked lack of will to tackle homophobia and transphobia, noting that public authorities had repeatedly banned pride marches on the basis of violent threats from homophobic groups and had failed to protect LGBT individuals and organizations from discrimination, including verbal and social media threats and physical attacks. The Belgrade Pride successfully took place in September 2014 in Belgrade. Since then, successful pride parades have been held every year, with local mayors and some government ministers regularly attending. In 2021, the association ILGA-Europe ranked Serbia 23rd in terms of LGBT rights out of 49 observed European countries.

In June 2017, Ana Brnabić became the Prime Minister of Serbia, as the first woman and first openly gay person to hold the office, and the second female LGBT head of government overall (after Jóhanna Sigurðardóttir of Iceland). She was also the first Serbian Prime Minister to attend a pride parade.

Law regarding same-sex sexual activity

Revolutionary Serbia (1804–1813)
Although religious laws existed prohibiting same-sex love and relationships, expressions were common in both Orthodox Christian and Islamic society. The primary expression of same-sex love for Orthodox Christians were brotherhood unions known as "Pobratimstvo" (Adelphopoiesis). The early nineteenth century saw a time of relative turmoil for Serbia, with sporadic periods of stability. In 1804, Serbia gained its autonomy from the Ottoman Empire following two uprisings. Karađorđe's Criminal Code (Карађорђев криминални законик) was subsequently promulgated by the Serbian Jurisprudential Council (Praviteljstvujušči sovjet serbski) sometime in late spring or early summer 1807, and remained in force until 7 October 1813, when the Ottoman Empire re-gained control of Serbia. The Code penalised certain issues related to marital life and sexuality (such as forced marriage, rape, separation/divorce without the approval of a clerical court, and infanticide). It did not, however, mention same-sex sexual activity; and so homosexuality became effectively legal for a period of six years.

Principality of Serbia (1815–1882)
In 1858, the Ottoman Empire, of which Serbia was nominally a vassal, legalized same-sex sexual intercourse.

However, the progressive reforms introduced by Prince Alexander Karađorđević and Prince Mihailo were overturned when Miloš Obrenović returned to power. In the first post-medieval Criminal Code of the Principality of Serbia, named "Kaznitelni zakon" (Law of Penalties), adopted in 1860, sexual intercourse "against the order of nature" between males became punishable by from 6 months' to 4 years' imprisonment. Like in many other countries' legal documents of the time, lesbian sexuality was ignored and not mentioned.

Kingdom of Yugoslavia (1918–1941)
In 1918, Serbia became a part of the Kingdom of Yugoslavia. At first, the new state effectively inherited the different laws that applied to the different territories that joined together (often contradictory). Eventually, the new Yugoslav Criminal Code of 1929 banned "lewdness against the order of nature" (anal intercourse) between both heterosexuals and homosexuals.

SFR Yugoslavia (1945–1992)

The Socialist Federal Republic of Yugoslavia restricted the offence in 1959 to only apply to homosexual anal intercourse, and the maximum sentence was reduced from 2 to 1 year's imprisonment.

In 1977, same-sex sexual intercourse was legalized in the Socialist Autonomous Province of Vojvodina, while male same-sex sexual intercourse remained illegal in the rest of the Socialist Republic of Serbia (including the Socialist Autonomous Province of Kosovo). In 1990, Vojvodina was reincorporated into the legal system of Serbia, and male homosexuality once again become a criminal offence.

FR Yugoslavia / Serbia and Montenegro (1992–2006)
In 1994, male homosexual sexual intercourse was officially decriminalised in the Republic of Serbia, a part of the Federal Republic of Yugoslavia. The age of consent was set at 18 years for anal intercourse between males and 14 for other sexual practices. An equal age of consent of 14 was later introduced on 1 January 2006, regardless of sexual orientation or gender.

Recognition of same-sex relationships

While same-sex couples have never been recognized by law, the new Serbian Constitution adopted in November 2006, explicitly defines marriage as being between a man and a woman (Article 62). However, other forms of recognition, such as civil unions or domestic partnerships, are not explicitly mentioned nor prohibited.

In June 2019, plans were announced to legalise domestic partnerships between same-sex couples by amending the Civil Code. Same-sex couples would be able to enjoy several legal rights, including joint property and alimony. They would not be granted inheritance or adoption rights, nor undergo surrogacy arrangements. The legislation remains pending. In July 2019, a lesbian couple, Jelena Dubovic and Sunčica Kopunović, from the northern city of Novi Sad, attempted to register a civil partnership at the municipal registrar's office, but were turned away. They filed a lawsuit, though legal experts believe it is unlikely that they will win the case.

In November 2020, Minister for Human and Minority Rights and Social Dialogue Gordana Čomić announced that the Law on same-sex partnerships will be in parliament in the first half of 2021. The draft law was presented for public consultation in February 2021.

Adoption and parenting
Same-sex couples cannot legally adopt. In early 2019, the Serbian Ministry of Health imposed a ban on those with a "history of homosexual relations during the last five years" from donating reproductive cells for artificial insemination or in vitro fertilisation. 

On 23 April 2021, the Ministry of Health deleted the provision which determines the donor of reproductive cells for artificial insemination or in vitro fertilisation cannot be a person with a "history" of homosexual relations.

Discrimination protections
Until 2002, Serbia had no legal protections specifically aimed at LGBT rights.

In 2002, the National Assembly approved the Broadcasting Law (Zakon o radiodifuziji) which prohibits Serbian broadcasting agencies from spreading information encouraging discrimination, hate and violence based on sexual orientation (among other categories).

In 2005, through a change in the Labor Law (Zakon o radu), discrimination based on sexual orientation in employment was banned. That same year, Parliament approved the Law on Higher Education (Zakon o visokom obrazovanju), which guarantees equal rights regardless of sexual orientation in those institutions (among other categories).

On 26 March 2009, Parliament approved a unified anti-discrimination law, known as the Anti-Discrimination Act of 2009 (Zakon o zabrani diskiminacije), which prohibits, among other categories, discrimination on the basis of sexual orientation and transgender status in all areas. The law specifically defines discrimination as follows:

On 5 July 2011, the Parliament approved a youth law, prohibiting discrimination on the ground of sexual orientation. The law regulates measures and activities undertaken by local governments at improving the social status of youth and creating conditions for addressing their needs and interests.

Laws against anti-LGBT speech
Since 2003, there has been legislation (part of the Information Law (Zakon o javnom informisanju)) specifically in place to counter verbal discrimination based on sexual orientation within the media. The same prohibition formed part of the Broadcasting Act adopted in 2002; however, it was never effectively observed, with the Radio Emitters Agency (an independent government agency) having failed to take any action against offenders. More widely, the Anti-Discrimination Law of 2009 prohibits hate speech on the basis of sexual orientation across wider Serbia society. With the adoption of the new amendments to the Anti-Discrimination Law in 2021, sex characteristics were included as a basis for prohibition of discrimination which makes Serbia the second country in the region to do so.

Hate crime laws
On 24 December 2012, the Serbian Parliament approved changes to the Penal Code to introduce the concept of a "hate crime", including on the basis of sexual orientation and gender identity. The first conviction under the law came in 2018.

Gender identity and expression
On 28 July 2011, the Parliament approved a change in the Health Insurance Law (Zakon o zdravstvenom osiguranju), based on which sex change surgeries became partially covered by the statewide basic medical insurance plan, beginning in 2012.

In 2012, The New York Times proclaimed Belgrade as a hub for sex reassignment surgery, as prices for such procedures are far lower than in neighbouring and Western countries.

Before 2019, transgender people in Serbia were allowed to change their legal gender only after having undergone sex reassignment surgery. Since 2019, it has been possible to change legal gender with a confirmation from a psychiatrist and an endocrinologist after a year of hormone replacement therapy, without undergoing any surgical procedure. Government-financed health insurance covers up to 65% of the surgery, while the remainder is financed by the patient. According to Jovanka Todorović, a program coordinator at Gayten-LGBT, about 80% of Serbian transgender people are not willing to go through surgery. Some choose to have hormone replacement therapy, which is not financed by health insurance. In addition, a reported 90% of LGBT individuals in Serbia argue that medical institutions are not adequately responding to their needs.

Military service
In 2010, the Serbian Army agreed that gay and bisexual men and women may openly serve in the professional army, but that news was not broadcast widely across media.

LGBT rights movement

Organizations
Many LGBT organizations have been founded in Serbia, especially in Belgrade and Novi Sad, though also in Niš, Kragujevac, Subotica, Šabac and Zrenjanin.

The first known LGBT organization in Serbia, Arkadija, was founded in 1990 in Belgrade. It shut down in 1995. That same year, Labris was established. Over the years, Labris has become one of Serbia's most prominent LGBT advocacy groups, regularly meeting with local government officials to discuss discrimination and violence prevention, raising awareness of LGBT rights through educational campaigns and public events, and campaigning for increased legal rights for same-sex couples.

Other groups include Gayten LGBT, founded in 2000 in Belgrade, Gay Straight Alliance (Gej Strejt Alijansa), based in Belgrade, Association Duga (Asocijacija Duga), based in Šabac and the region, and Belgrade Pride (Beograd Prajd), established in 2011.

LGBT Vojvodina, Novi Sad Lesbian Organization, and LGBT Novi Sad are among several groups working in the northern region of Serbia, Vojvodina.

GOOSI, based in Belgrade, advocates on behalf and campaigns in favor of LGBT people with disabilities.

Online communities and news portals, sorted by founding date, descending
1998: Gay-Serbia.com
2001: Adriatic LGBT Activism, formerly known as Yugoslavian LGBT Activism
2001: GayEcho, formerly known as Queeria
2008: GayRomeo, version in Serbian
2011: Optimist LGBT magazine
2012: Szerbiai Magyar LMBT Csoport, the Hungarian LGBT community in Serbia
2012: Gay Serbia Guide

Social conditions

Gays and lesbians continue to face discrimination and harassment in Serbia. The majority of Serbian people retain strong attitudes against homosexuality. There have been numerous instances of violent gay-bashing, the most extreme during the first Belgrade Gay Pride in 2001.

Several pride events have had to be cancelled. Pride Day celebrations in Belgrade in 2004, and another in Novi Sad in 2007, were cancelled because of the inability to provide adequate safety against violence due to resource constraints. The 2009 Belgrade Pride was also cancelled for similar reasons, as police could not guarantee the safety of the participants. The Second Belgrade Pride parade went ahead on 10 October 2010, with the participation of around a thousand people. However, it was met with violent reaction culminating in the Belgrade anti-gay riot attended by 6,000 anti-gay protesters and extreme nationalist group members.

Official medical textbooks that classify homosexuality under "sexual deviations and disorders" were in circulation and widely used. After several requests to do so, the Serbian Medical Society finally stated that same-sex orientation is not a disease in an official letter to Labris, a Serbian LGBT organization, in 2008. Homosexuality has been removed from the official list of diseases since 1997, when Serbia started applying ICD-10.

The protection of LGBT people in Serbia is further complicated by the existence of various nationalist and neo-Nazi associations like "Obraz", "1389" and "Stormfront", which are supported by some right-wing political parties. These groups have, on several occasions, made their threats to LGBT people publicly known though the media, and the police are increasingly reacting to deter such threats publicly.

The development of LGBT rights and culture in Serbia is supported by LGBT sites such as GayEcho and Gay-Serbia and the oldest Adriatic LGBT Activism mailing list in the region.

2016–present
In August 2016, Ana Brnabić was appointed Minister of Public Administration and Local State Governments, becoming the first openly lesbian minister in Serbia. In June 2017, Serbian President Aleksandar Vučić appointed Brnabić to be the Prime Minister. She was sworn in on 29 June 2017. Her appointment received criticism and opposition from both left-wing and right-wing groups. Left-wing groups accused Brnabić of being a "puppet" to the President and that her sexual orientation would serve as a cover-up for human rights abuses. Right-groups opposed her nomination because of her sexual orientation.

In 2017, a prominent Serbian LGBT activist, Boban Stojanović, received asylum in Canada after documenting approximately 1,000 different pages of violence directed at him and his partner. In an interview in April 2018, Stojanović's partner said the violence put a lot of pressure on them, compelling the couple to leave Serbia.

In September 2017, Prime Minister Brnabić took part in the pride parade in Belgrade. At the event, Brnabić said:

In February 2019, Milica Đurđić, Brnabić's partner, gave birth to a son named Igor. According to Agence France-Presse, "Ana Brnabić is one of the first prime ministers whose partner has given birth while in office... and the first in the world in a same-sex couple".

On 17 May 2019, on the occasion of International Day Against Homophobia, Transphobia and Biphobia, several hundred people gathered in the center of Novi Sad for what was described as the northern Serbian city's first gay pride rally. The event was organized by the local nongovernmental group, Exit, with the support of city officials.

Asylum recognition
In 2019, asylum was granted to a young Iranian gay man on the basis of his sexual orientation.

Public opinion
According to the Commissioner for the Protection of Equality, research carried out in 2012 showed that 48% of Serbs believed that homosexuality is an illness.

According to a 2017 poll carried out by ILGA, 59% of Serbians agreed that gay, lesbian and bisexual people should enjoy the same rights as straight people, while 24% disagreed. Additionally, 64% agreed that they should be protected from workplace discrimination. 21% said that people who are in same-sex relationships should be charged as criminals, while 55% disagreed. As for transgender people, 63% agreed that they should have the same rights, 65% believed they should be protected from employment discrimination and 51% believed they should be allowed to change their legal gender. Additionally, a majority of Serbians would accept an LGBT neighbour.

According to 2018 data from the Equal Rights Association, 26 percent of the country's population would cease contact with a person if they learned that person was LGBT, 38 percent of population believed that homosexuality was a disease, 48 percent of parents would seek medical treatment for their LGBT child, 70 percent opposed the right of an LGBT person to inherit the property of their deceased partner, and 90 percent opposed child adoption by LGBT person.

According to 2017 data from the research conducted by Centre E8, 44.0% of females agree that same-sex marriage should be legal (14.8% totally agree and 29.2% agree) while 38.2% oppose (15.0% totally oppose and 23.2 oppose). At the same time, 32.6% of male respondents agree that same-sex marriage should be legal (12.8% totally agree and 19.6% agree) while 50.8% oppose (26.2% totally oppose and 24.6% oppose).

According to 2021 data by Civil Rights Defenders, while support for same-sex marriage remains low (26%), when broken down into individual rights anticipated to be regulated by the Law on Same Sex Union, there is widespread support for each right (59%-73%). 80% of citizens believe LGBTI+ persons should have at least some rights anticipated to be regulated by the Law on Same Sex Union, the second highest among all Western Balkan countries (after Montenegro, which adopted legislation on same-sex registered partnerships in 2020). In the case of almost every right, support is significantly higher among younger (18-29) and University-educated respondents from Belgrade and Vojvodina. Attitudes towards almost all issues related to the LGBTI+ community have remarkably improved in Serbia over the past 5 years. While improvements have been noted, the research shows homophobia is still prevalent on several major accounts across society, such as that 57% believe homosexuality is a disease.
Over 2/3 of responds believe peaceful Pride marches should be allowed to take place in Belgrade.

Summary table

See also

Human rights in Serbia
The Parade (film)
LGBT rights in Europe
LGBT history in Serbia

References

Further reading 
 
 Rhodes-Kubiak, Robert (2015). Activist Citizenship and the LGBT Movement in Serbia: Belonging, Critical Engagement, and Transformation

External links

 
Human rights in Serbia